Trichadenia is a genus of plants in the family Achariaceae.

Species include:
 Trichadenia zeylanica Thwaites

 
Malpighiales genera
Taxonomy articles created by Polbot